Zinnia grandiflora is a species of flowering plant in the family Asteraceae known by the common names Rocky Mountains zinnia and plains zinnia. It is native to the southwestern and south-central United States (Kansas, Oklahoma, Texas, Colorado, New Mexico, Arizona) and northern Mexico (Chihuahua, Coahuila, Sonora, Tamaulipas, Nuevo León, Zacatecas).

The herbage is covered in short, rough hairs. At the center is a cluster of several tubular disc florets. It grows on plains and foothills and other dry habitat.

Uses
This plant is used by several Native American groups, including the Zuni and Navajo, for medicinal and ceremonial purposes.

Among the Zuni people, this plant is applied in a poultice to bruises, cold infusion of blossoms used as an eyewash, and smoke from powdered plant inhaled in sweatbath for fever.

References

External links

grandiflora
Flora of the Western United States
Flora of Mexico
Plants described in 1840
Plants used in traditional Native American medicine
Flora without expected TNC conservation status